Train to Pakistan is a historical novel by writer Khushwant Singh, published in 1956. It recounts the Partition of India in August 1947 through the perspective of Mano Majra, a fictional border village. 

Instead of depicting the Partition in terms of only the political events surrounding it, Khushwant Singh digs into a deep local focus, providing a human dimension which brings to the event a sense of reality, horror, and believability.

Plot
Mano Majra, the fictional village on the border of Pakistan and India in which the story takes place, is predominantly Muslim and Sikh. Singh shows how they lived in a bubble, surrounded by mobs of Muslims who hate Sikhs and mobs of Sikhs who hate Muslims, while in the village they had always lived together peacefully. Villagers were in the dark about happenings of larger scope than the village outskirts, gaining much of their information through rumor and word of mouth. This made them especially susceptible to outside views. Upon learning that the government was planning to transport Muslims from Mano Majra to Pakistan the next day for their safety, one Muslim said, “What have we to do with Pakistan? We were born here. So were our ancestors. We have lived amongst [Sikhs] as brothers” (126). Juggut Singh, a local Sikh tough, has a Muslim lover Nooran, who leaves for the refugee camp. After the Muslims leave to a refugee camp from where they will eventually go to Pakistan, a group of religious agitators comes to Mano Majra and instills in the local Sikhs a hatred for Muslims and convinces a local gang to attempt mass murder as the Muslims leave on their train to Pakistan. Juggut, knowing Nooran is in one of the rail-cars, acts on instinct and sacrifices his life to save the train.

Analysis

Social structure and cultural understanding among the people about the book
In a relatively short book, the reader gets to know a lot of characters in detail. Examination of the varied groups of people not only increases cultural and social understanding of that time and place, but also shows that the blame could not be placed on any one group; all were responsible.
“Muslims said the Hindus had planned and started the killing. According to the Hindus, the Muslims were to blame. The fact is, both sides killed. Both shot and stabbed and speared and clubbed. Both tortured. Both raped” (1).

If groups of people are examined on a closer level than their religious attachments, a more detailed social structure emerges. Government officials were corrupt, manipulative of villagers, and could arrest anyone they chose for any reason, more often than not for their own benefit. They did just enough in terms of dealing with the dispute so that nobody could say that they did not do anything.  The law enforcement was completely at the whim of the local government, meaning that in practice, there was no law.  Also, small amounts of educated people trickled in and out of villages, trying to instill in people democratic, communist, or other western ideologies, though the common people were turned off and confused by their unorthodoxy.  When one such educated man was speaking to a villager about freedom, the villager explained,
“Freedom is for the educated people who fought for it.  We were slaves of the English, now we will be slaves of the educated Indians—or the Pakistanis” (48).

To better understand the situation surrounding the partition of India, Singh provides information about both religions involved.
The book sheds light on the various religious practices of both Sikhs and Muslims in rural India. Singh describes daily life for individuals from both practices. For example, Singh describes the practice of prayer for Muslims.
“The mullah at the mosque knows that it is time for the morning prayer. He has a quick wash, stands facing west towards Mecca and with his fingers in his ears cries in long sonorous notes, Allah-o-Akbar (4)”
Singh points out practices of Sikhs as well,
“The priest at the Sikh temple lies in bed till the mullah has called. Then he too gets up, draws a bucket of water from the well in the temple courtyard, pours it over himself, and intones his prayer in monotonous singsong to the sound of splashing water (5)"".

Moral message and character development
The story is an extract from the novel published in 1956. It talks about how partition affected a small village where people from all religions and sects once lived in harmony. More than giving the details of partition, singh has recounted what impact it had on people. In addition to giving an understanding of human actions and pointing out that everyone was responsible, Singh makes a background moral commentary which bubbles up through main characters in their thoughts and their actions. Hukum Chand is the District magistrate, and one of the main characters in the story. It becomes apparent that he is a man in moral conflict who has probably used his power over the years with much corruption. He is often described with a dirty physical appearance as if he is overwhelmed with unclean actions and sins, and is just as often trying to wash himself of them, similar to Pontius Pilate after Christ was condemned. Hukum Chand’s ethical issues are shown in one of repeated encounters he has with two geckos, which likely represent Muslims and Hindus in conflict, on the verge of fighting each other. When they start fighting, they fall right next to him, and he panics. The guilt he gets from not helping when he has more than enough power to do so literally jumps onto him.

“Hukum Chand felt as if he had touched the lizards and they had made his hands dirty. He rubbed his hands on the hem of his shirt. It was not the sort of dirt which could be wiped off or washed clean” (24).

Alcoholism is another tool Hukum Chand uses in attempt to clean his conscience. He feels the guilt of his actions by day and relieved of them by night, when his alcohol is able to justify trysts with a teenage prostitute the same age as his deceased daughter. In all his conflictions, he is able to acknowledge that what he is doing is bad, but is still unable to promote good.

The two other main characters that are given a lot of attention are Iqbal Singh and Juggut Singh, and are likely meant to be contrasted. Iqbal is described as a slightly effeminate, well-educated and atheist social worker from Britain who thinks politically (and cynically).  Juggut is a towering, muscular, and uneducated villager who places action over thought and is known for frequent arrests and gang problems. As if to warm them up for comparison, they were both arrested for the same murder they did not commit, and were placed in adjacent cells. Upon their release, they learned that a gang was planning to attack the train taking Mano Majra’s Muslim population to Pakistan and kill the passengers; Juggut's Muslim lover Nooran is also supposed to be on that train. They each had the potential to save the train, though it was recognized that this may cost their lives. Juggut, nevertheless, acts on instinct and sacrifices his life to save the train. Iqbal spends pages wondering to himself whether he should do something, exposing a moral paradox on the way:

It is important to note that Iqbal or the learned people are less of action,  while the people of Juggat's breed are less about talking.

“The bullet is neutral. It hits the good and the bad, the important and the insignificant, without distinction. If there were people to see the act of self-immolation…the sacrifice might be worth while: a moral lesson might be conveyed…the point of sacrifice…is the purpose. For the purpose, it is not enough that a thing is intrinsically good: it must be known to be good. It is not enough to know within one’s self that one is in the right” (170).

The questions of right versus wrong which Singh poses throughout the book are numerous, including those of what one should do when one has the opportunity to prevent something bad, when an act of goodwill is truly worthwhile, and how much importance is the consciousness of the bad.  Train to Pakistan, with its multiple gruesome and explicit accounts of death, torture, and rape for the public to read, makes the case that people do need to know about the bad.

Politics
Khushwant Singh does not describe the politics of the Partition in much detail. This is mostly because his purpose is to bring out the individual, human element and provide a social understanding, two aspects of historical events which tend to be either ignored or not covered effectively in texts. In the Partition, the major change was political; the partition of India into Hindu India and Muslim Pakistan. The effect of the change, however, was significant and as Singh has shown, frighteningly, social, as religious groups rearranged and clashed violently. Singh makes it clear that many people played a part in this chaos and everyone was equally worthy of blame, all while integrating examples of the sheer moral confusion which arises from trying to make sense of an event as momentous as the Partition.

Characters

Iqbal Singh 
He is a political agitator who encourages peasants to demand more political and economic rights. He identifies himself as a "comrade" which suggest that he is part of the Communist organization. Iqbal is a Sikh, given his last name and the band he wears, but does not practice the religion anymore. He is portrayed throughout the novel as Muslim. Iqbal has an affinity for English costumes and practices, "his countrymen's code of morals had always puzzled him, whit his anglicized way of looking at things. The Punjabi's code was even more baffling. For them truth, honor, financial integrity were 'all right'" (41).

Juggut (Jugga) Singh 
Jugga is described as a budmash, a bad man, by others but ultimately becomes a hero. One of the central protagonists and in many ways a foil to Iqbal, Jugga seeks to redeem himself over the course of the novel. He’s framed for the dacoity, used as a scapegoat for the police, and abused by many in Mano Majra. But Jugga is also an honest man, and he tends to change his ways once he falls in love with Nooran. His crude language and wordplay often contradicts his inner morality: “I was out of the village . . . but was not murdering anyone. I was being murdered” (106). (I.e., “being murdered” here refers to his sexual relationship with Nooran.) He is large in frame (6 foot, 4 inches tall) and is prone to violent tendencies.

Hukum Chand 
Hukum Chand is the deputy commissioner in Mano Majra and has authority over the sub-inspector and the head constable. His daughter, along with other members of his family, have died, but it's not clear how. Her death deeply affects him and fuels his detached, utilitarian style of policing; he centers on saving as many lives as possible, at any cost. This includes restricting the freedom of the people to keep them safe (i.e., imprisoning Jugga and Iqbal despite knowing that they are innocent). 

He is described as depressed and he is deeply marked by the violence of the Partition. For example, when Chand is reflecting on the train massacre, he focuses on his memories of the bodies: they haunt him despite his efforts to remove them from his mind. Furthermore, he is obsessed with death, viewing it as “the only absolute truth"; he is afraid that when someone dies, their existence no longer matters. When he recalls the train, he can only imagine the utter terror felt by the passengers, which manifests in a belief that life must be made as pleasurable as possible through hedonistic behaviors.

Film adaptation
A movie based on this novel and having the same title Train to Pakistan was released in 1998. It was directed by Pamela Rooks and this movie was nominated in Cinequest Film Festival, 1999 in the best feature film category. Nirmal pandey, Mohan Agashe, Rajit Kapoor, Smriti Mishra, Divya Dutta, Mangal Dhillon were the main cast of this movie.

Plays

A play based on this novel and having the same title "Train to Pakistan", however the first chapter "Dacoity" was staged at Lamakaan - an open cultural space in Hyderabad, India. The play was staged by a theatre group called Aami. The play was adapted and directed by Krishna Shukla. This play was staged three times, the latest being on 26 August 2014.

A Hindi play translated by Usha Mahajan, dramatized by Suman Kumar and directed by Amar Sah (Amar Nath Sah) was staged by Bela Theatre Karwaan on December 29, 2019 at Kamani Auditorium (Mandi House, Delhi), January 10, 2020 and last production on January 23, 2020. It received standing ovation on each show.

2006 edition
Roli Books in New Delhi published a new edition of the novel together with 66 of Margaret Bourke-White's photographs of the violence. In late 2006, Roli was hoping to find an international distributor for the edition at the Frankfurt Book Fair (in October, 2006).

Train to Pakistan has also translated into the Kannada(ಕನ್ನಡ) and  Tamil languages as same titled by Dr.M B Ramamurthy and Raman Raja respectively. In 1976, it was translated into Telugu (తెలుగు) by Late Akundi Narayana Murthy. Prior to bringing into book form, it was serialized in the then popular Telugu Magazine Krishna Patrika.

Notes

Sources
 Sengupta, Somini, "Bearing Steady Witness To Partition's Wounds," an article in the Arts section, The New York Times, September 21, 2006, pages E1, E7
 Lance Truong, "Character Development" An excerpt from A writing assignment, St. Paul College, September 16, 2006

External links
Khushwant Singh talking about the writing of 'Train to Pakistan'

20th-century Indian novels
1956 novels
Historical novels
Indian historical novels in English
Indian novels adapted into plays
Partition of India in fiction
Indian novels adapted into films
Chatto & Windus books
Novels by Khushwant Singh
1956 Indian novels
Sikhism in fiction